Davenport railway station  serves the Davenport suburb of Stockport, Greater Manchester, England.

The station is 7 miles (11 km) south east of Manchester Piccadilly on the Buxton Line.

History

It was opened by the Stockport, Disley and Whaley Bridge Railway on 1 March 1858, as a result of a complaint from Colonel William Davenport, a local landowner, that the company had not honoured its initial promise to provide a station at Bramhall Lane (which was, at that time, just outside the boundary of Stockport Borough). A small passenger station was opened and named Davenport.  Trade was slight and it closed in September 1859, to be reopened on 1 January 1862.

Facilities

The station has a ticket office at street level, which is staffed in the mornings through until early afternoon, six days per week (closed all day Sunday).  At all other times, tickets must be bought on the train or prior to travel.  Waiting shelters are provided at platform level on each side, whilst train running information is offered by means of CIS displays and timetable posters.  No step-free access is available to either platform, as each one is linked to the ticket office and road via staircases.

Service

Through running north of Manchester ceased temporarily as part of a major timetable change in May 2018. Through running was stopped again in December 2022.

Hope Valley Line trains towards/from Chinley or Sheffield do not normally stop here.

References

External links

Davenport Railway Station site

Railway stations in the Metropolitan Borough of Stockport
DfT Category E stations
Former London and North Western Railway stations
Railway stations in Great Britain opened in 1858
Railway stations in Great Britain closed in 1859
Railway stations in Great Britain opened in 1862
Northern franchise railway stations
1858 establishments in England